Rafael Godoi Pereira (born 7 May 1985) is a Brazilian football striker.

Football career
Godoi started his career at Ponte Preta. He signed a two-year contract with club in March 2003.

In August 2006, he signed a three-year deal for Villa Rio. In summer 2007, he signed for Modriča. In January 2008, he moved to Belgian club Sint-Truidense. In July 2008, he returned to Bosnia and Herzegovina this time to play with Laktaši. In summer 2009, he signed for Swiss club Montlingen.

In 2004, he was part of the Brazilian U-20 team that won a friendly tournament in Barcelona.

References

External links
 Brazilian FA Database
 Austrian FA Database

1985 births
Living people
Brazilian footballers
Sportspeople from Campinas
Association football forwards
Associação Atlética Ponte Preta players
Campeonato Brasileiro Série A players
Villa Rio Esporte Clube players
Sint-Truidense V.V. players
Expatriate footballers in Belgium
FK Modriča players
FK Laktaši players
Expatriate footballers in Bosnia and Herzegovina
Expatriate footballers in Switzerland